Port Olry is a small Francophone village on the island of Espiritu Santo in the Sanma Province of Vanuatu, with a population of 1,300, as estimated in 2009.

Known for its verdant green hills, crystal clear waters and white sand beaches, the village of Port Olry offers tourists access to two local nature reserve islands, via an underwater sandbar traversed at low tide.  Port Olry has a large Catholic population, and is home to a Catholic mission. In 1998, Port Olry was hit hard by Tropical Cyclone Zuman, but it has since recovered, and living standards and amenities have noticeably improved in the village.

Economy
The local economy is heavily dependent on fishing, a traditional male role, while many females find work gardening. Port Olry produces octopus, beef, copra, and cocoa. The economy is male-centric, women are usually not given a say in typical daily business deals, and rely on their husbands.

Port Olry's standard of living has improved since 2009, and citizens now enjoy electricity, tar-sealed roads, improved healthcare (a renovated health centre with new facilities), commercial bank access (NBV - Vanuatu's own bank branch), a new post office branch, a renovation for its secondary school, new restaurants, bungalows along the beach, and more retail shops.

Transportation to Luganville, the largest town in the area, is usually done by taxi and bus. However, locals often hitchhike on trucks travelling to the town, typically loaded with bags of copra and other market products.

Education
Education in the village follows the French system. Parents usually send their children to the village schools, Saint Anne Primary and Saint Anne Secondary. Children who perform well in their Year 6 examinations can pursue their secondary studies in Saint Anne's branch, or choose to attend other schools around Luganville, Sanma Province, and even schools in other parts of the country. A lot of Port Olry children earn higher education qualifications (Year 14 certificates, Year 13, 12, 10), and a few earn bachelor's degrees from the University of the South Pacific, with campuses in Suva, Fiji, and Port Vila, Vanuatu's capital.

Cyclone Zuman
In 1998, Tropical Cyclone Zuman hit Vanuatu.  On Espiritu Santo Island, over 100 buildings were destroyed or damaged, and an estimated 60-70% of crops were destroyed. Port Orly was hit hard, with 95% of buildings and gardens reporting some sort of damage.  As part of the relief effort, the town was donated 50 tarpaulins to provide shelter for those affected by the disaster.

Populated places in Vanuatu
Sanma Province